The 1897 All-Ireland Senior Football Championship Final was the tenth All-Ireland Final and the deciding match of the 1897 All-Ireland Senior Football Championship, an inter-county Gaelic football tournament for the top teams in Ireland. 

William Guiry scored both of Dublin's goals, as they won 2-6 to 0-2, having led 1-2 to 0-1 at half time.

At this time, club teams represented their counties with the CJ Kickhams club, captained by PJ Walsh, representing Dublin and Cork represented by the Dohenys club from Dunmanway.

It was the fourth of six All-Ireland football titles won by Dublin in the 1890s.

References

Final
All-Ireland Senior Football Championship Finals
Cork county football team matches
Dublin county football team matches